Naves is a commune in the Corrèze department in the Nouvelle-Aquitaine region in central France.

Geography 
Naves's territory is crossed by the rivers Corrèze, Solane, Vigne, Vimbelle, and Céronne.

History 
Situated on the crossroad of two importants Roman ways, Naves of Latin Navea (fertile valley), was established in Gallo-Roman period, in this time the village included temples, theater and many other monuments.

Naves is now growing, thanks to the arrival in 2002 of the A89 linking Lyon to Bordeaux. Since 2000, the people pouring into the town which knows a growth rate of 13% over the past ten years. They are mostly active youth mostly working in Tulle.

Population

See also
Communes of the Corrèze department

References

Communes of Corrèze
Lemovices